Marmara habecki is a moth of the family Gracillariidae. It is found in Florida, United States.

The larvae feed on Schinus terebinthifolus. They mine the leaves of their host plant.

References

Moths described in 2011
Gracillariinae